"Nobody's Child" is a song by Penny McLean released as a single in 1976. Though it does not appear on any of McLean's studio albums, it was included on two compilation albums years later: The Best of Penny McLean and Profile. The song managed to appear in 2 charts worldwide. The song was included in the soundtrack of the Brazilian soap opera Locomotivas.

Charts

References

1976 singles
Penny McLean songs
Disco songs
1976 songs
Songs with lyrics by Michael Kunze
Songs with music by Sylvester Levay